Robert Ferguson (25 July 1917 – 17 June 2006) was an English professional footballer who played as a goalkeeper in the Football League for Middlesbrough and York City, in non-League football for Hurworth Juniors and Goole Town and was on the books of Peterborough United without making a league appearance.

References

1917 births
People from Grangetown, North Yorkshire
2006 deaths
English footballers
Association football goalkeepers
Middlesbrough F.C. players
York City F.C. players
Peterborough United F.C. players
Goole Town F.C. players
English Football League players
Footballers from Yorkshire